Gomu or Gömü may refer to:

Gömü, Amasra, village in Bartın Province, Turkey
Gömü, Emirdağ, village in Afyonkarahisar Province, Turkey
Gomu or Moo language, Adamawa language of Nigeria
Gomu District, former district in the old Ōsumi Province, Japan